The Singles Collection 1989–1997 is a CD by The Bruisers that was released in 2004 by Taang! Records. The album features the Intimidation EP [tracks 1-4], Clobberin' Time EP [tracks 5-7], remixed Independence Day EP [tracks 8-14], American Night EP [tracks 17-18], Gates Of Hell EP [tracks 19-20], Molotov CD/EP [tracks 21-25], split with Charge 69 [track 26], and split with Randums [tracks 27-28]. Tracks 15 and 16 were previously released on In the Pit - Live and Rare.

Song list
 Intimidation  
 Bloodshed  
 Society's Fools  
 Anchors Up  
 Overthrow  
 No Truce  
 Work Together (The Oppressed cover)  
 Never Fall  
 My Pride  
 21 Years  
 Nation On Fire (Blitz cover) 
 We Will Survive  
 Independence Day  
 Eyes Of Fire  
 Bloodshed  
 Society's Fools  
 American Night  
 Brown Paper Bag  
 Gates Of Hell  
 Tear It Up  
 These 2 Boots Of Mine  
 Six Of Them  
 Molotov  
 Nomad  
 Intimidation '97  
 Never Fall  
 Nation On Fire (Blitz cover) 
 Greed

External links
The Bruisers

The Bruisers albums
2004 albums